Northumberland County is located in northeastern New Brunswick, Canada.

Geography
Northumberland County is covered by thick forests, whose products stimulate the economy. The highest peaks in the province, including Mount Carleton lie in the northwestern corner of the county.

The county is dominated by the Miramichi River, world famous for its salmon fishing.  The lower portion of the river is an estuary that widens into Miramichi Bay, a part of the Gulf of St. Lawrence.

Services
The city of Miramichi is a local service centre for the county and surrounding regions with schools, hospitals and government offices and retail locations.  The county has several saw mills in the city of Miramichi and up the Southwest Branch of the Miramichi River.  There were formerly two large pulp and paper mills at Miramichi.

Chatham was also home to an air force base, CFB Chatham, until 1996.  Renous-Quarryville, located along the Southwest Miramichi was also home to an army post - a federal maximum security penitentiary is now located on the site.

Census subdivisions

Communities
There are five municipalities within the county (listed by 2016 population):

First Nations
There are five First Nations reserves in Northumberland County (listed by 2011 population):

Three communities in the county are part of the Miꞌkmaq Nation: Metepenagiag Miꞌkmaq Nation, at the junction of the Northwest Miramichi River and the Little Southwest Miramichi River; Eel Ground First Nation, close to the junction of the Northwest and Southwest Miramichi Rivers near Newcastle; and Burnt Church First Nation on the northern shore of Miramichi Bay.

Parishes
The county is subdivided into thirteen parishes (listed by 2016 population):

note:  Statistics Canada did not report data for Ludlow Parish in the 2016 Census.  Data shown is from 2011 Census.

Demographics

Language

Access Routes
Highways and numbered routes that run through the county, including external routes that start or finish at the county limits:

Highways

Principal Routes

Secondary Routes:

External Routes:
None

Protected areas and attractions

Notable people

See also
List of communities in New Brunswick

References

External links
Northumberland County Guide

 
Counties of New Brunswick